This is a list of educational institutions in Pakistan.

By level
Schools
Madrassas
Colleges
Universities
Research institutes
Special education institutions

By profession
Schools of accounting
Schools of art
Schools of architecture
Schools of business
Schools of computing
Schools of dentistry
Schools of engineering
Schools of law
Schools of medicine
Schools of nursing
Schools of pharmacy
Schools of theology
Schools of veterinary medicine
Abbottabad
Faisalabad
Gujranwala
Hyderabad
Islamabad
Jhelum
Karachi
Lahore
Multan
Peshawar
Rawalpindi
Sahiwal
Sargodha
Sialkot
Sukkur

See also
 Education in Pakistan
 List of universities in Pakistan

References